Deccan Gymkhana is an area in Pune city named for the Deccan Gymkhana Sports Club, which lies in the centre of the city.

See also
Shivajinagar
Gymkhana
Swargate
Pune Railway Station
Pune
Pune District
Maharashtra

References

External links

Neighbourhoods in Pune